Jake Bergey (born May 4, 1974 in Covington, Kentucky) is a retired lacrosse player. Bergey played ten seasons for the Philadelphia Wings in the National Lacrosse League. Bergey is the son of former NFL star Bill Bergey, and brother of fellow lacrosse player Josh Bergey.

NLL
Bergey joined the Philadelphia Wings in 1998. Bergey quickly became a fan favorite, wearing #66, the same number his father wore with the Philadelphia Eagles where he was a star linebacker.  He was a member of both the 1998 & 2001 National Lacrosse League Champion's Cup Wings teams. Bergey was an alternate captain for the Wings from 2001 to 2007. and was Captain for the 2004 season. At the end of the 2007 season, Bergey was the second leading scorer in Wings history.

After playing 10 years for the Wings, Bergey was chosen by Boston coach and former teammate Tom Ryan in the 2007 National Lacrosse League expansion draft.  Subsequent to the draft, Boston put the "franchise tag" on him to retain his rights for the 2008 season. Boston drafted Bergey even though he had off-season knee surgery and was considering retirement.

Bergey has stated that he has no intention of playing outside of Philadelphia.  In the Philadelphia Daily News, Bergey was quoted as saying 

During the 2007 Entry Draft, Bergey was traded back to the Wings in exchange for two late round draft picks.

After the Blazers sat out the 2008 season, another expansion draft was held, and again Bergey was chosen by Boston. However, in February 2009, he was traded back to the Wings for a conditional draft pick so that he could retire as a member of the only team he had ever played for.

MLL
In 2001 & 2002, Bergey played in Major League Lacrosse for the Rochester Rattlers.  In 2003, he was limited to one game with the Baltimore Bayhawks due to injury a knee injury that also forced him to miss the entire 2003 NLL season.  He has not played in the MLL since.

Collegiate
Jake scored five goals in the NCAA Men's Lacrosse Championship game as a freshman at Salisbury State University in 1995, helping the team win its second-ever NCAA Division III national title. He was also a first-team All-American in 1995, 1996, and 1997 at Salisbury. Bergey was a high school All-American in 1993 at Tatnall School.

Statistics

NLL

MLL

Salisbury University

References

1974 births
Living people
American lacrosse players
National Lacrosse League All-Stars
Sportspeople from Covington, Kentucky
Philadelphia Wings players
Salisbury Sea Gulls men's lacrosse players